Hyalotephritis planiscutellata is a species of tephritid or fruit flies in the genus Hyalotephritis of the family Tephritidae.

Distribution
Israel, Egypt, Ethiopia.

References

Tephritinae
Insects described in 1903
Taxa named by Theodor Becker
Diptera of Africa
Diptera of Asia